German submarine U-3523 was a Type XXI U-boat (one of the "Elektroboote") of Nazi Germany's Kriegsmarine, built for service in World War II. She was ordered on 6 November 1943, and was laid down on 7 October 1944 at F Schichau GmbH, Danzig, as yard number 1668. She was launched on 14 December 1944, and commissioned under the command of Oberleutnant zur See Willi Müller on 23 January 1945.

Design
Like all Type XXI U-boats, U-3523 had a displacement of  when at the surface and  while submerged. The submarine was powered by two MAN SE supercharged six-cylinder M6V40/46KBB diesel engines each providing , two Siemens-Schuckert GU365/30 double-acting electric motors each providing , and two Siemens-Schuckert silent running GV232/28 electric motors each providing .

U-3523 was fitted with six  torpedo tubes in the bow and four  C/30 anti-aircraft guns. She could carry twenty-three torpedoes, or seventeen torpedoes and twelve mines. The complement was five officers and fifty-two men.

Sinking
All 58 crewmen were lost.

References

Bibliography

External links
 

 

Type XXI submarines
U-boats commissioned in 1945
World War II submarines of Germany
1944 ships
Ships built in Danzig
Ships built by Schichau
World War II shipwrecks in the Skagerrak
Maritime incidents in May 1945
Ships lost with all hands